Xanil River,, Saquilukun or downstream Agua Azul River is an approximately 30 km long river in southeastern Mexico. The river rises in the Chiapas Highlands and flows from Chiapas to the state of Tabasco into the Tulija River. Its name originates from the village with spa (balneario) of the same name Xanil, which lies at the highway from Palenque to Ocosingo.

In 2017 water flow at Cascadas de Agua Azul was found to be drastically reduced, due to a new embankment of the river, endangering the rivers ecosystem.

Gallery

See also
Rio Grijalva
Agua Azul Cascades

Sources

Rivers of Chiapas
Rivers of Tabasco
Grijalva River
Chiapas Highlands